Wen Chih-hao (born 25 March 1993) is a Taiwanese football player who plays as a midfielder.

Club career
Wen Chih-hao played for the National Pei Men Senior High School team before having an unsuccessful trail at Chinese club Beijing Enterprises Group on 1 December 2011. He went on to start his senior career when he joined reigning league champions Taiwan Power Company where he quickly established himself as a vital member of their team by going on to win the 2012 Intercity Football League title with them as well as personally winning the player of the season and top goalscorer award along the way. Beijing Enterprises became interested in Wen Chih-hao again and he joined them before the start of the 2013 China League One season. Wen Chih-hao left Beijing BSU after the 2021 season.

Personal life
Wen is a graduate from North Gate high school and whose parents are both full-blood Bunun people.

Career statistics

Club career statistics 
Statistics accurate as of match played 31 December 2020.

International goals

U19

U23

National team
As of match played 5 September 2019. Chinese Taipei score listed first, score column indicates score after each Wen Chih-hao goal.

Honours

Club
Taiwan Power Company
Winner
 Intercity Football League: 2012

Individual
Awards
 League best player of the season: 2012
Performances
 League top-goalscorer: 2012

References

External links 
 

1993 births
Living people
Taiwanese footballers
Chinese Taipei international footballers
Association football forwards
China League One players
Beijing Sport University F.C. players
Taiwanese expatriate footballers
Bunun people
People from Hualien County